Société Nouvelle Maison de la Ville de Tunis, or SNMVT Monoprix (مونوبري), is a chain of grocery stores in Tunisia, with its head office in Mégrine. They are operated by the Groupe Mabrouk, which in 2007 had a 38% marketshare in Tunisia. It is listed on the Bourse de Tunis since April 1995.

Historically the company had ties with the Zine al-Abidine Ben Ali government.

See also

 Monoprix (French stores)

References

External links
 Monoprix Tunisia 

Companies of Tunisia
Supermarkets of Africa